John Naylor may refer to:
John Naylor (cricketer) (1930-1996), English cricketer
John Naylor (organist) (1838-1897), English organist
John Naylor (walker) (1844-1933), coauthor of From John o' Groat's to Lands End
James Nayler (1618–1660), also known as John Naylor, English Quaker
John Naylor (astrologer), English astrologer
John D. Naylor (1893-1955), America athlete and college sports coach